The Lahore is a breed of fancy pigeon known for its impressive size and gentle nature. Lahores, along with other varieties of domesticated pigeons, are all descendants of the rock pigeon (Columba livia).

Origin
Originating in Lahore, this bird was also bred in the area presently found in India and Iran. It was imported into Germany around 1880 and became popular among pigeon enthusiasts at the beginning of the 1960s. They are usually found in the area of Shiraz and are some of the most colorful pigeons. These ornamental pigeons from ancient Persia were once bred for their meat, but today they are raised for their beautiful plumage and colorful patterns. Their calm and gentle natures also make them ideal as pets.

Appearance
From shoulder to shoulder, it measures . Its markings are also unusual: the base color is white, with a secondary color beginning at the juncture of beak and wattle and spreading in an arc over the eyes and across the back and wings. The rump and tail are to be white, though in pigeon shows the majority of attention is paid to the quality of the head, neck, and wing markings.

The neck should be heavily feathered and should lead to a full, broad chest. Cheeks should be plump, and the beak should be "broad and stout and rather blunt at the tip."  Feet and legs are feathered so that the bird appears to be wearing thick stockings.

Lahore are bred in many different colors, including blue-bar, checkered, red, blue, brown, and black.

Behavior
The Lahore is generally a very gentle and shy pigeon. They are good natured and can be tamed quickly.

Gallery

See also
List of pigeon breeds

References

Arizona Pigeon Club: Detailed description of show qualities
Lahore Club

Pigeon breeds
Pigeon breeds originating in India
Pigeon breeds originating in Pakistan